This is a list of personal air vehicles.

PAVs competing in PAV Challenge

Other PAVs

References

Comparison
Personal air vehicle comparison
Aviation-related lists
Ultralight aircraft
Ultralight aviation